Scytonema is a genus of photosynthetic cyanobacteria that contains over 100 species.  It grows in filaments that form dark mats.  Many species are aquatic and are either free-floating or grow attached to a submerged substrate, while others species grow on terrestrial rocks, wood, soil, or plants.  Scytonema is a nitrogen fixer, and can provide fixed nitrogen to the leaves of plants on which it is growing.  Some species of Scytonema form a symbiotic relationship with fungi to produce a lichen.

Scyptolins are a type of elastase inhibitors isolated from some species of Scytonema.

A study comparing red macroalgae to Scytonema species showed their potential for cosmetical use, both for their antioxidants properties and photoprotection capacities due to their compounds MAAs, and scytonemin (unique to Scytonema). This study indicated that they could be used as photoprotectors absorbing both in the UV-B and UV-A.

Species 
Scytonema includes the following subtaxa:

References

External links 
Scytonema

Nostocales
Cyanobacteria genera